The University of the District of Columbia Community College (UDC-CC) is an open-enrollment, public junior college located in Washington, D.C. It operates the associate degree, Certificate, Continuing Education and Workforce Development programs that are offered by the University of the District of Columbia.

History 
The Normal School for Colored Girls was established in 1851 and by 1879, the name was changed to "Miner Normal School". Washington Normal School was established in 1873 for girls, and renamed the "Wilson Normal School" in 1913. In 1929, the United States Congress made both schools four-year teachers' colleges and renamed as "Miner Teachers College" for African Americans and "Wilson Teachers College" for whites. In 1955, the two schools merged and were renamed the "District of Columbia Teachers College".

In 1967, Congress awarded the University of the District of Columbia (UDC)  land-grant status and a $7.24 million endowment (USD), in lieu of a land grant.

Beginning with the 2009–10 academic year, UDC's programs were split and the UDC Community College (UDC-CC) assumed UDC's associate degree, Certificate, Continuing Education and Workforce Development programs, with UDC's other colleges and schools going forward with the bachelor and graduate degree programs.  While UDC-CC maintains an open enrollment policy, UDC has instituted higher admission standards for the bachelor and graduate programs.  These changes were in response to UDC's low graduation rate, where only 7.9% of students complete their degrees within 6 years.

In early 2012, University of the District of Columbia Community College tried achieve independent accreditation but discovered that it couldn't get accredited because UDC's, its host university, finances were so unstable.

Academics
UDC-CC offers the following academic programs:

Certificate Programs
Nursing Assistant
Office Technology
Practical Nursing

Associate Degrees
Administrative Office Management
Architectural Engineering Technology
Automotive Technology 
Aviation Maintenance Technology
Business Technology
Construction Management 
Computer Accounting Technology
Computer Science Technology
Corrections Administration
Education
Infant / Toddler Education
Early Childhood/School Age (Pre-K – Grade 3)
General Education (Elementary and Secondary)
Fashion Merchandising New!
Graphic Communication Technology
Graphic Design
Hospitality Management & Tourism
Law Enforcement
Legal Assistant
Liberal Studies
Mortuary Science
Music
Nursing (Program Suspended)
Respiratory Therapy

The 2009-10 year was a transition period where UDC-CC operated from the UDC campus while a new location for its programs was being developed. UDC-CC now provides classes at ten locations throughout Washington DC.

Campus
The main (Van Ness) campus of UDC is located at Connecticut Avenue and Van Ness St. in Northwest Washington, DC. Some UDC-CC students live in this dorm. The main UDC campus will continue to house UDC-CC's mortuary science program.

UDC-CC has established a number of other locations to conduct its programs beginning with the Fall 2010 semester:
UDC-CC Center: 801 North Capitol Street NE - main academic and administrative center
Bertie Backus: 5171 S. Dakota Ave. NE - Health related and other programs
Excel Institute: 2851 V Street NE - automotive technology degree program
Ronald Reagan National Airport, Hangar #2 - aviation maintenance technology programs Workforce development programs are offered at a number of DC High School campuses.

A location in the Bellevue neighborhood of Southeast D.C. may also open.

UDC has announced plans to move the community college, headquartered near Union Station, back to Tenleytown as a facility cost-cutting measure. Other UDC officials said because of a strong union presence was to blame for the costs.

See also

 Normal School for Colored Girls
 University of the District of Columbia

References

External links
Official website

Land-grant universities and colleges
Universities and colleges in Washington, D.C.
Community College
Educational institutions established in 1851
1851 establishments in Washington, D.C.